Lizin may refer to:
 Anne-Marie Lizin (1949–2015), Belgian politician
 Ltsen, Armenia